The resolution regarding the coat of arms of the Pomeranian Voivodeship was taken on by the Sejmik of the Pomeranian Voivodship in Gdańsk.

On a yellow background, the image of a black Griffin of Pomeranian-Wendish origin, with raised wings and a red tongue out of the mouth.

The first example of the coat of arms is a 16th-century image of the griffin, which is in the presbytery of the Oliwa Cathedral.

The image of the black griffin looking towards the right, on a yellow background, is also known for being the coat of arms of Kashubians.
Therefore, these two coats of arms are often identified; according to some sources, as being one and an identical coat of arms.

The creator of the coat of arms is Wawrzyniec Samp.

Polish-Lithuanian Commonwealth 

Between the years of 1454 and 1795, the coat of arms of the Pomeranian Voivodship was represented by a red griffin on a white background.

Second Polish Republic
The coat of arms did alter substantially, "the coat of arms still included a red griffin looking to the left on a white background. The front legs were positioned as if they were to run, wings as if they were preparing to flight, the tongue was hanging out, and a crown on the head". There was a certain amount of controversy regarding the griffin being the coat of arms, as the former Chełmińskie Voivodeship had now been incorporated within the Pomeranian Voivodeship, whose coat of arms was a sworded eagle.

Historical

Heraldry 
Kashubian Griffin in heraldry:

Kashubian Griffin on coats of arms of Polish cities and towns:

Pomerania
Pomeranian Voivodeship
Pomeranian Voivodeship